Dima Slobodeniouk (Димa Слободенюк;( born 1975) is a Finnish  conductor based in Finland.

Biography
As a youth, Slobodeniouk began his violin studies in Moscow, from 1980 to 1989, at the Moscow Central Music School, where his teachers included Zinaida Gilels.  He settled in Finland at age 17.  Slobodeniouk continued his violin studies at the Conservatory of Central Finland and the Sibelius Academy.  He was also in the conducting class of the Sibelius Academy, where his teachers included Leif Segerstam, Jorma Panula and Atso Almila.

Slobodeniouk was principal guest conductor of the Kymi Sinfonietta from 2004 to 2006. From 2005 to 2008, he was chief conductor of the Oulu Symphony Orchestra (Oulu Sinfonia).  He was artistic director of the Korsholm Music Festival in 2007 and in 2009.

In November 2012, Slobodeniouk first-guest conducted the Orquesta Sinfónica de Galicia (OSG).  On the basis of this appearance, in February 2013, the OSG named Slobodeniouk its next principal conductor, effective with the 2013-2014 season.  In March 2015, the OSG extended his initial contract through 2019.  In July 2018, the OSG and Slobodeniouk agreed on a further extension of his OSG contract through 2022.

Slobodeniouk became chief conductor of the Lahti Symphony Orchestra (Sinfonia Lahti) as of the 2016-2017 season.  In April 2016, his initial Lahti contract was extended through 2021.  He concluded his chief conductorship of Sinfonia Lahti at the close of the 2020-2021 season.  His commercial recordings include an album of works by Lotta Wennäkoski.

References

External links
 Official webpage of Dima Slobodeniouk
 KD Schmid agency page on Dima Slobodeniouk

Russian conductors (music)
Russian male conductors (music)
21st-century Russian male musicians
1975 births
Living people
Finnish people of Russian descent
Naturalized citizens of Finland
Russian expatriates in Finland
Russian-speaking Finns